Dujeous is a live hip-hop band based in New York City. Dujeous songs are a diverse mix of topics, but they often talk about life in New York City ("City Limits", New York Views"), post-millennial paranoia ("Sometimes", "It's..."), and sometimes, just having a good time ("Good Green," "Drowsy"). Their music has been featured on television (the theme to Crank Yankers, for example) and big screen (scoring Universal Pictures film Blue Crush). They've recently been promoting their weekly "No Clearance" free downloads, and leaks from their second album Day In Day Out.

Members

The band consists of seven main members:

Mojo the Cinematic (Loren Hammonds) Born and raised in the East Harlem neighborhood of Manhattan (as he says in the title track of City Limits).  He has collaborated with Immortal Technique, Akir, Delta, Aesop Rock, Vast Aire of Cannibal Ox, producer Omen, and many others. Mojo is also working on a solo album, titled Blackademic.

Rheturik (Aaron Jones) Born and raised in Uptown Manhattan, Rheturik is the group's second MC.  He attended Philadelphia's University of Pennsylvania as an undergraduate, where he was roommates with R&B singer John Legend and producer Devo Springsteen. Rheturik also produced "Dominant Species" on Immortal Technique's Revolutionary Vol. 1.

Mas D (David Kupferstein) Also an Uptown Manhattan native, MasD is Dujeous' third MC and is the son of Jamaican and Jewish immigrants. Mas D is also a photographer and designer, and is responsible for much of the group's artwork, such as album covers, single covers, and flyers.

Taylormade (born Taylor Rivelli) Taylormade is the group's guitarist and its main producer. He was raised in the Washington Heights neighborhood of Manhattan. He is the group's primary recording engineer. As a producer, Taylormade has also worked with Saigon, Rhymefest, Nipsey Hussle, John Legend, Sharon Jones, MTV2, Kardinal Offishall, Dip Set, Nas, Keith Murray, HBO, BET and many more.

Dave Guy Manhattan native Dave Guy is Dujeous' trumpeter. He toured with Amy Winehouse. He is a member of Daptone Records funk bands the Dap-Kings, Sugarman 3, Menahan Street Band, and Budos Band,  and is first trumpeter in Charles Tolliver's Big Band. He has also played for Mark Ronson, Nancy Sinatra, Wynton Marsalis, and Lily Allen.

Tomek (Tomek Gross) Tomek, is the group's drummer and one of its producers. He is also known for singing on certain Dujeous songs and onstage. He has also produced for NYC rapper Subconscious, and is a founding member of New York electronica group WIldlife.

Apex (Alex Gale) Apex is the group's bassist and one of its producers. He has also produced for underground MCs Akir and Subconscious.

Early years

Dujeous first came together in its current lineup in the late 90s, while the members were in high school. All of the members attended either Hunter College High School or LaGuardia School for the Performing Arts, both public high schools located in Manhattan. The three vocalists attended elementary school together, which is where they conceived the word Dujeous, which they have claimed is a "shape-shifting word" that means "all things good" in various interviews.

Dujeous got its start at high school talent shows and then moved on to small venues throughout the city. Their first show was at the Harlem School of the Arts. Dujeous' first received radio airplay on the Stretch Armstrong & Bobbito radio show on 89.9 WKCR-FM.

City Limits
After playing shows in the NYC area and releasing products independently, Dujeous released City Limits, their first internationally distributed full-length release. The album garnered attention in the New York Daily News, The Source magazine (in which they were featured in the Unsigned Hype column, which also brought Biggie Smalls, Common, Eminem, and many other notable rap groups to fame), Time Out New York, and Urb (which named the group one of the Top 100 new artists of the year).

2004 also saw Dujeous travel the globe in support of City Limits. They toured France and Poland, and also reached the West Coast and Midwest for the first time.

TV and Movies
Dujeous music has been featured in many television shows and movies. They produced and cowrote the theme song for MTV2's Crank Yankers with Chicago MC Rhymefest. Their music has also been featured in TNT's Saved, Universal Pictures film Blue Crush, and many other notable shows and movies (see discography).

Discography (partial) 

For full discography, see external links.

2009
No Clearance (mixtape)

2008
"Break Bread" b/w "Research" (digital single release)

2007
 Game 7 (mixtape)
 album, TBA, forthcoming

2006
 Live at Southpaw (CD, live album)
 Half Nelson Soundtrack (“Sometimes”)
Mojo, The Cinematic Advances (mixtape)

2005
AOL mixtape
Live in Warsaw (CD, live album)

2004
 City Limits (CD, 2xLP)
 Sometimes b/w The Rules (12)
 Good Green b/w City Limits & The Wrench & The Chain

2003
 Heavy Traffic Mix Tapes I and II (CD)
 The Bastard EP (EP)
 As Promised (CD)

2002
 Spilt Milk b/w All MCs (12")

1999
 Breathtaking? b/w Epic Proportions & Cinematics (12)

1998
Wax Pos Greatest Hits (tape)

1997
 Live in the Studio (tape)

1996
 Leading by Example (tape)

1995
 "New York Views" b/w "Expo" (exclusive)

Dujeous Featured Recordings

2007
 Lily Allen, “Smile” (Mark Ronson RMX) feat. Mojo & Dave Guy

2006
Akir, Legacy, "Legacy," feat. Mas D & Mojo
Akir, Legacy, No Longer My Home, feat. Mojo,
Akir, Legacy, Louisiana Purchase, feat. Mojo
Delta, The Lostralian, The Greater Good, feat. Mojo

2005
EQ f. Mojo, "Follow Through"
EQ f. Mojo, "Groupie"

2003
 Rob Swift, Sound Event, Salsa Scratch feat. D-Styles & Bob James, Dave Guy (trumpet)
 Rob Swift, Sound Event, The Caper, Dujeous
 Rob Swift, Sound Event, The Ghetto, Dujeous

1999
 Mr. Len feat. Dujeous, Hidden Jewels, Sightlines
 Rob Swift, The Ablist, All That Scratching
 Rob Swift, The Ablist, Modern Day Music

Dujeous Production/Songwriting

2007
 Mark Ronson, Versions, several songs co-written by Dave Guy & Apex

2006
 Akir, Legacy, "Legacy," prod. by Apex

2005
 Nas feat.Saigon, War Remix, co-prod. by Taylormade, featured in HBOs Entourage
 Purple City, "Gun Go" feat. Jim Jones & Juelz Santana, prod. by Taylormade & Dujeous
 Keith Murray, "Swagger Back", He's Keith Murray, co-written by Taylormade
 Beetroot, 13, co-written by Apex

2003
 Immortal Technique, Revolutionary Vol. 1, Dominant Species, prod. by Rheturik
2002
Mojo & Subconscious, "The Angel & The Insect," prod. by Apex

Dujeous Session Work

2007
 Mark Ronson, Versions, several songs, Dave Guy (trumpet) & Apex (bass)
 Amy Winehouse, Back to Black, several songs, Dave Guy (trumpet)
 Charles Tolliver, With Love, Dave Guy (trumpet)

2006
 Rhymefest, Sista, produced by Mark Ronson, Apex (bass)
 Mark Ronson, untitled forthcoming album, Apex (bass) & Dave Guy (trumpet)
 Akir, Legacy, Homeward Bound," Dave Guy (trumpet)
 Akir, Legacy, This Is Your Life," Apex (bass)

2005
Sharon Jones & The Dap Kings, Naturally, Dave Guy (trumpet)
 Ladybug Mecca, Trip The Light Fantastic, Children Say, Oh Poor You, You Never Get It, Apex (bass)

2004
 Immortal Technique, Revolutionary Vol. 2, Cause of Death, Taylormade (guitar, bass)
 Immortal Technique, Revolutionary Vol. 2, Internally Bleeding, Dave Guy (trumpet)

2003
 Rob Swift, Sound Event, Salsa Scratch feat. D-Styles Dave Guy & Bob James (trumpet)
 Rob Swift, Sound Event, The Caper, (bass, guitar, trumpet, co-writing)
 Rob Swift, Sound Event, The Ghetto, (bass, trumpet, co-writing)

2002
Lil Stef, "Misdemeanor," prod. by Kanye West, (bass, guitar, trumpet)

Film, Television, and Multimedia

2007
 Crank Yankers (TV series, MTV 2), theme song
 Hip-Hop: Beyond Beats & Rhymes, (documentary, PBS), several songs featured in score

2006
 Final Fight: Streetwise, video game, Capcom: City Limits, Its, and First/Last featured in score, album image featured in game
 Half Nelson, feature film, Hunting Lane/Think Films: Sometimes featured in score and soundtrack
 Andy Milonakis: Season 1, TV series on DVD, MTV: Good Green, Sometimes, and Its featured in score
Entourage, TV series, HBO: Nas feat. Saigon War Remix featured in score

2005
 Ultimate Hustler, TV series, BET: background scoring
 Kings & Queen, feature film, Wellspring Films: Spilt Milk featured in score

2004
 Soul Purpose, feature film, Teton Gravity: Good Green featured in score

2003
 The Life, TV series, ESPN: background scoring
 Just Another Story, feature film, Showtime: Spilt Milk featured in score

2002
 Blue Crush, feature film, Universal Films: Move and Sightlines featured in score

2001
 Lift, feature film Showtime Networks: All MCs featured in score
 PSA, Partnership for a Drug-Free America/MTV: scoring
 Paper Soldiers, feature film, Roc-a-Fella Films: scoring

1999
 Song for Celia, feature film: scoring
 Featured band, www.levis.com Web Launch

References

External links

American hip hop groups
Musical groups from New York City